Sophie Elizabeth Wilcox (born 2 January 1975 in Croydon, London) is an English actress who is most notable for appearing in the BBC miniseries adaptation of The Chronicles of Narnia as Lucy Pevensie when she was 13 years old. She appeared in The Lion, the Witch and the Wardrobe in 1988, as well as its sequel Prince Caspian and the Voyage of the Dawn Treader in 1989, but has only appeared in a small number of acting roles since.

After a more than decade-long absence from acting, Wilcox returned to the screen with a small role in the film Gangster Kittens.

Filmography 
 1988: The Lion, the Witch and the Wardrobe
 1989: Prince Caspian and the Voyage of the Dawn Treader
 1999: Mr. Ma & Son 
 1999: Forgotten 
 2001: Dark Blue World (Tmavomodrý svet)
 2016: Gangster Kittens

References

External links 

1975 births
English television actresses
Living people
English child actresses
People from Croydon